There have been several railroads named Gettysburg:
 the Gettysburg Railroad, a forerunner of the Western Maryland Railroad
 the Gettysburg Railroad (1976–96), a short-line railroad
 the Gettysburg Railway, a short-line railroad
 the Gettysburg Electric Railway, an interurban